The men's shot put at the 1998 European Athletics Championships was held at the Népstadion on 18 August.

Medalists

Results

Qualification
Qualification: Qualification Performance 20.00 (Q) or at least 12 best performers advance to the final.

Final

References

Results
Results
Results

Shot put
Shot put at the European Athletics Championships